Aftershock is an album by the R&B band Average White Band, released in 1989. Three original bandmembers returned; Alex Ligertwood joined on vocals. Chaka Khan sang on two of the album's songs. Track Records, the band's label, was unable to effectively promote Aftershock. The album was a moderate success in Europe.

Track listing
 "The Spirit of Love"  (4:05)
 "Sticky Situation"  (4:29)
 "Aftershock"  (4:07)
 "Love at First Sight"  (4:47)
 "I'll Get Over You"  (4:32)
 "Later We'll Be Greater"  (3:52)
 "Let's Go All the Way"  (5:53)
 "We're in Too Deep"  (3:54)
 "Stocky Sachoo-a-Shun"  (1:38)

Personnel
Alan Gorrie – Bass, Guitar, Keyboards, Vocals
Onnie McIntyre – Guitar, Vocals
Roger Ball – Saxophone, Synthesizer horns
Alex Ligertwood – Lead and Background vocals
Eliot Lewis – Keyboards, Programming, Guitar, Vocals, Drums, Percussion

Additional musicians
Ronnie Laws – Soprano Saxophone
Chaka Khan – Vocals
Billy Beck – Keyboards
Ohio Players – Background vocals and chorus

References

Average White Band albums
1989 albums